Old St. Mark's Episcopal Church building is located in Beaver Dam, Wisconsin and was built in 1858. The congregation moved to the present site on East Mill Street in 1978, previously used as a Pentecostal church. Old Saint Mark's on East Maple at North Lincoln Avenue, now a child care facility, was added to the National Register of Historic Places in 1980. Saint Mark's Church   is part of the Episcopal Diocese of Milwaukee. For information about the parish at its present location see www.stmark-beaverdam.org.

References

Churches on the National Register of Historic Places in Wisconsin
Episcopal churches in Wisconsin
Churches completed in 1858
Churches in Dodge County, Wisconsin
19th-century Episcopal church buildings
National Register of Historic Places in Dodge County, Wisconsin
Beaver Dam, Wisconsin